Roxana Maracineanu (born 7 May 1975) is a Romanian-born French politician, former swimming champion and television consultant who served as Minister Delegate in charge of Sports in the government of Prime Minister Jean Castex (2020–2022) and as Minister of Sports under Édouard Philippe (2018–2022).

Born in Romania, Maracineanu moved to France as a child, acquiring the citizenship via naturalisation at age 16. An accomplished swimmer Maracineanu became the first French world swimming champion in January 1998. She won silver medal in the 200 m backstroke at the 2000 Summer Olympics in Sydney.

She was the Ensemble candidate in Val-de-Marne's 7th constituency in the 2022 French legislative election, but lost out to Rachel Keke from NUPES.

Family and childhood
Born in Bucharest, Romania as  Roxana Mărăcineanu, she practiced gymnastics as a child. Her father, thanks to a contract of cooperation, went to work in Algeria, taking his family. They then moved to France in 1984 where they asked for asylum to flee the Ceauşescu regime. It was in Blois, in a transit center, that she learned French. She went to secondary school at Jean Macé College in Mulhouse. She was naturalized French in 1991 at the age of 16 years.

She graduated from ESCP Europe in 2005 and has a master's degree in English and German.

Sporting career

Representing the Mulhouse Olympic Swimming team, whose coach was Lionel Horter, Maracineanu won her first French national title in 100 meters and 200 meters at the 1991 summer championships.

In Seville, at the 1997 European Championships, she was beaten by Germany's Antje Buschschulte in the 100 meters back and third in the 200-meter backstroke, behind Germany's Cathleen Rund and Antje Buschschulte.

At the 1998 Worlds Championships in Perth, she began her competition with a sixth place finish in the 100m backstroke, won by Lea Maurer. Before the 200-meter final, her coach Lionel Horter assures her that if she leads the 150-meter race, she will win the race. First in front of Germany's Dagmar Hase, she becomes the first French world swimming champion.

In October 2004, she announced her retirement two months after Laure Manaudou's 400m triumph at the Athens Olympics. She had been a childhood idol of Manaudou's, having sent a letter to her in her youth.

Sports consultant and other activities

Consultant

In March 2007, at the World Swimming Championships in Melbourne, she was a consultant for France Télévisions alongside Alexandre Boyon and Michel Rousseau, and for L'Équipe TV. Since the 2008 Olympic Games in Beijing, she has been a consultant on the public group and on Europe 1. She renewed this collaboration for the 2009 World Championships in Rome, the 2010 World Short Course Championships in Dubai, the 2010 European Championships in Budapest, at the 2012 Olympic Games in London.

At the 2014 European Championships, Frédérick Bousquet, injured, was a consultant to Maracineanu, Alexandre Boyon and Nelson Monfort. For the next major competition, at the 2015 Kazan World Championships, the France Télévisions group, wishing to reform the duo Philippe Lucas and Laure Manaudou, did not renew her contract.

In 2009, she received the Sports Commentator Award from the Association of Sports Writers. It rewards "a journalist, professional, audiovisual commentator, with the appreciated knowledge and the judgment which, in its interventions on the sport, will be expressed with the constant concern to respect the rules of the French language".

Candidate at the FFN

With the resignation of Lionel Horter from the position of National Technical Director, the French Swimming Federation, she was. In 2015, she was among the last three candidates of a replacement list established by the Ministry of Sports. The post was finally awarded to Jacques Favre.

Volunteering

Maracineanu took part in the program "Eat well, it's well played!" launched in 2005 by the Sports Foundation. She was also involved in the production of videos aimed at young athletes to teach them the basics of a diet adapted to physical effort, as part of a program of the Sports Foundation sensitizing children to the importance of physical activity.

Political career

Regional Councilor

A candidate on the list of the Socialist Party, she was elected to the regional council of Île-de-France on 21 March 2010 and joined the sports and leisure commission. Her mandate ended with the renewal of the Regional Council on 13 December 2015.

Minister of Sports
In July 2018 Prime Minister Édouard Philippe asked her to participate in an interministerial mission (between Education and Sports) to find ways to improve swimming in France's primary schools.

On 4 September 2018, Maracineanu was appointed Minister of Sports in the Philippe Government, replacing Laura Flessel.

In January of 2020, Maracineanu successfully forced the resignation of Didier Gailhaguet, the president of the French Federation of Ice Sports, over what she considered his failure to appropriately handle sexual abuse allegations within the sport of figure skating, following allegations by retired pairs skater Sarah Abitbol against her former coach Gilles Beyer, a Gailhaguet ally. Maracineanu subsequently ordered a broad investigation of sexual abuse in French sporting culture that resulted in over 400 individuals being accused of wrongdoing.

Minister delegate in charge of Sports
On 6 July 2020, following the appointment of Jean Castex as the new French Prime Minister and a cabinet reshuffle, Maracineanu became Minister delegate in charge of Sports, attached to the Minister of National Education, Youth and Sport, Jean-Michel Blanquer.

Orders and awards
National Order of Merit (France)
Legion of Honour (France)
Sports Commentator Award 2009

References

External links
 
 
 
 

1975 births
Living people
French female backstroke swimmers
Olympic swimmers of France
Olympic silver medalists in swimming
Olympic silver medalists for France
Swimmers at the 2000 Summer Olympics
Medalists at the 2000 Summer Olympics
World Aquatics Championships medalists in swimming
European Aquatics Championships medalists in swimming
Mediterranean Games medalists in swimming
Mediterranean Games gold medalists for France
Swimmers at the 1997 Mediterranean Games
Universiade medalists in swimming
Universiade bronze medalists for France
Sportspeople from Bucharest
Romanian emigrants to France
Naturalized citizens of France
ESCP Europe alumni
Women government ministers of France
21st-century French politicians
21st-century French women politicians